Pertya is a genus of Asian flowering plants in the family Asteraceae.

 Species

References

Asteraceae genera
Pertyoideae